3 Puppis (3 Pup) is a supergiant star in the constellation Puppis. It is a very rare A[e] supergiant, referred to as a B[e] star despite its spectral classification, and its apparent magnitude is 3.93.

3 Puppis is surrounded by a disc of circumstellar dust, which is unusual for an A-type star. It is thought to be caused by a low mass companion. Like most B[e] stars, 3 Pup rotates rapidly, at 30% - 60% of the speed at which it would start to break apart. The disc has its inner edge only 3.8 AU from the primary star and it is suspected that deceleration of the hot primary stellar wind by the companion allows the dust to form unusually close to such a luminous star.

References

Puppis
A-type supergiants
Emission-line stars
Puppis, 03
Spectroscopic binaries
2996
037677
062623
CD-28 4774
B(e) stars
Puppis, I